Perspecta: The Yale Architectural Journal is a peer-reviewed academic journal published since 1952 by the Yale School of Architecture and distributed by the MIT Press. Graduate students are competitively chosen to edit each issue. It is the oldest architectural journal of its kind in the United States. Contributors include some of the most important figures in contemporary architecture worldwide.

References

Further reading 
  Robert A.M. Stern, Peggy Deamer, Alan Plattus, Re-Reading Perspecta: The First Fifty Years of the Yale Architectural Journal, 2005

External links 
 
 Perspecta series on the MIT Press website

Architecture journals
Publications established in 1952
MIT Press academic journals
English-language journals
Annual journals
Academic journals edited by students
Yale University academic journals